Zhao Ling (born October 7, 1981) is a Chinese archer, who won the silver medal in the team and a bronze in the individual competition at the 2006 Asian Games.

References 

Living people
1981 births
Chinese female archers
Place of birth missing (living people)
Asian Games medalists in archery
Archers at the 2006 Asian Games
Asian Games silver medalists for China
Asian Games bronze medalists for China
Medalists at the 2006 Asian Games
21st-century Chinese women